Thakattur is a village in Nagapattinam district in the Indian state of Tamil Nadu.

Cities and towns in Nagapattinam district

ta:தகட்டூர்